The English rock band Buzzcocks' discography consists of ten studio albums, five live albums, eleven compilations, ten extended plays and twenty-six singles.

Studio albums

Live albums

Compilation albums

Extended plays

Singles

Notes

References

External links
 Buzzcocks discography on Buzzcocks Official Site (PDF version)
 [ Buzzcocks Discography] at AllMusic
 Buzzcocks at Discogs

Discography
Discographies of British artists
Pop punk group discographies